Aiona Santana (December 31, 1999, Leuven, Belgium), is a Canadian-Venezuelan singer, songwriter and model. She is predominantly described as a Latin music artist, but has experimented with a variety of other genres including pop music. 

She represented National Capital Region at the Miss Universe Canada 2019, and has been recognized at the Latin Awards Canada as "Best New Artist" in 2020, in addition to multiple nominations in 2022.

Artistic career 
Santana studied for a Bachelor of Music in Voice and a minor in Arts management at Carleton University. Since 2018, she has officially ventured into music.

As model 
She participated in Miss Canada Latina 2018 where she finished in fifth place. In 2019, she competed at Miss Universe Canada 2019, where she received the title of Miss Eco Teen Canada 2019 and competed in Miss Eco Teen International in Egypt in November where she won the Best in Resorts Wear category during the competition held at Swiss Inn Resort Dahab.

She competed at Miss World Canada 2019, where she became the first winner of the 'Head-to-Head Challenge'. She finished in the top 3 in the Talent competition, in the Top 6 among the Beauty with a Purpose project, and placed in the Top 8 overall on the final night.

Santana represented Canada at the inaugural Miss Glamour International 2021, as she was crowned Miss Glamour International Canada 2021 on December 23, 2021. She was on the cover of Now! in live magazine in September 2022.

As singer 
In 2020 Santana released her first album "Invicta Pt. 1", where she collaborated with NTHN and Marty Party. This album features a fusion of urban Latin music sounds, as well as pop music elements. In November Santana and NTHN released "Psycho" from her "Invicta Pt. 2" EP. The following year she released her first fully English-language recording, a pop tune titled "In My Feels".

She was a guest at the CBC Music Ottawa event called: 'Project Give' a fundraising event for a food bank in the city of Ottawa, Canada. The event was premiered live nationwide on CBC Music Ottawa station and Santana sang an acoustic set.

After this release Santana was nominated for her songs "Sin Ti" and "Diosa" for the "Latin Awards Canada", for two consecutive years and won the awards for "Best New Artist – Revelation of the Year". The awards gala took place in Montreal, Canada. Among the winners of this gala, the collaboration "Mentiras" was created with Landy García.

Her song "Fronteo" achieved a million views on YouTube within four days of its release. It was written and produced in collaboration with Raniero Palm. Her next single "La Santa" reached the playlists in Spain. That year she would also be included in the CBC Music's Toyota Searchlight 2022, top 100 artists with the greatest projection from Canada.

In 2023 it was announced by the Latin Awards Canada, that the artist is nominated in six categories: Songwriter of the Year for her song "La Santa", Urban Song of the Year for her collaboration on "Mentiras" with Landy Garcia and Many Sparks, Best Urban Fusion Pop Song for “La Santa”, Urban Duo or Group for their collaboration with Landy García, Artist of the Public (Popular Vote), and Best Music Video for “La Santa” and “Fronteo”.

Discography

Studio albums 

 2020: "Invicta"

EP 

 2020: "Invicta Pt. 1"
 2020: "Invicta Pt. 2"

Filmography 

 2019: Homekilling Queens as Homecoming Contestant

Awards and recognition 

 2019: Miss Universe Canada – Miss Eco Teen Canada 
 2020: Latin Awards Canada "Best New Artist" – "Revelation Artist of the Year"
 2022: Latin Awards Canada "Best Music Video" for "La Santa"

References

External links 

 
 

Living people
1999 births
Venezuelan singers
Venezuelan composers
Venezuelan singer-songwriters
Venezuelan women singers
Women in Latin music